WrestleMania Goes Hollywood is a tagline and marketing name that has been used by WWE for their marquee professional wrestling event, WrestleMania, when held in the Greater Los Angeles area.

It may refer to:

 WrestleMania 21, a 2005 event.
 WrestleMania 39, a 2023 event.